The Labour Party leadership of Keir Starmer began when Keir Starmer was elected as Leader of the UK Labour Party in April 2020, following the resignation of Jeremy Corbyn after Labour's defeat at the 2019 general election. Starmer's tenure as leader has been marked by his opposition to some of the government’s response to the COVID-19 pandemic and various other issues involving the government, including Partygate, the cost of living crisis, and the industrial disputes. In February 2023, Starmer's antisemitism reforms resulted in the party no longer being monitored by the Equality and Human Rights Commission (EHRC).

During Starmer's tenure, his party suffered the loss of a previously Labour seat in the 2021 Hartlepool by-election, followed by holds in the 2021 Batley and Spen by-election and the 2022 Birmingham Erdington by-election, and a gain from the Conservative Party in the 2022 Wakefield by-election. Labour received mixed results in the 2021 local elections, followed by gains in the 2022 local elections. Since the end of 2021, Labour consistently polled ahead of the Conservatives as the governments under prime ministers Boris Johnson, Liz Truss, and Rishi Sunak were affected by issues such as the cost of living crisis, the July 2022 government crisis, the September 2022 mini-budget, the October 2022 government crisis, and the National Health Service strikes. Amid these issues, Labour won the 2022 City of Chester by-election, the party's best-ever result in the seat. Starmer's party have also gained leads in opinion polling for the next general election, due to be held no later than January 2025.

2020 Leadership contest 

Following his party's landslide defeat by Boris Johnson's Conservative Party at the 2019 general election, Jeremy Corbyn announced his intention to resign as Leader of the Labour Party. On 4 January 2020, Keir Starmer announced his candidacy for the ensuing leadership election. By 8 January, it was reported that he had gained enough nominations from Labour MPs and MEPs to get onto the ballot paper, and that the trade union Unison was backing him. Unison, with 1.3 million members, said Starmer was the best placed candidate to unite the party and regain public trust. Supporters of Rebecca Long-Bailey criticised Starmer for releasing details of his campaign donations on the register of members' interests rather than independently, as Long-Bailey and Lisa Nandy had done, which meant that details of his donors were not published until after voting had opened.

Starmer went on to win the leadership contest on 4 April 2020, defeating Long-Bailey and Nandy, with 56.2% of the vote in the first round, and subsequently became Leader of the Opposition.

Leader of the Opposition 
In his leadership acceptance speech, Starmer said he would refrain from "scoring party political points" and planned to "engage constructively with the government", having been elected amid the COVID-19 pandemic.

First Shadow Cabinet 
In April 2020, Starmer’s Shadow Cabinet was appointed over the course of the week following the leadership election, which included former leader Ed Miliband, as well as both of the candidates he defeated in the contest. He also appointed Anneliese Dodds as Shadow Chancellor of the Exchequer, making her the first woman to serve in that position in either a ministerial or shadow ministerial capacity.

2020 Shadow Cabinet dismissals 
On 25 June 2020, Starmer dismissed his former leadership rival Rebecca Long-Bailey from her post as Shadow Secretary of State for Education. Long-Bailey had refused to delete a tweet calling the actress Maxine Peake an "absolute diamond" and linking to an interview in The Independent in which Peake said that the practice of kneeling on someone's neck by US police, as used in the murder of George Floyd in Minneapolis, was "learnt from seminars with Israeli secret services". The original article stated that "the Israeli police has denied this." Starmer said that because the article "contained anti-Semitic conspiracy theories" it should not have been shared by Long-Bailey. The decision to dismiss Long-Bailey was criticised by the Socialist Campaign Group, whose members met with Starmer about the decision. The decision was welcomed by some Jewish groups including the Board of Deputies and the Jewish Labour Movement. Starmer said that "restoring trust with the Jewish community is a number one priority. Antisemitism takes many different forms and it is important that we all are vigilant against it." On 27 June, he replaced her with Kate Green.

On 23 September 2020, three frontbenchers (Olivia Blake, Nadia Whittome, and Beth Winter) rebelled against Labour's position of abstention on the Overseas Operations (Service Personnel and Veterans) Bill and voted against the bill; all three lost their frontbench roles over the issue. This move was seen as an indication of the firm discipline Starmer intends to exert over his party.

2020 rebels and Shadow Cabinet resignations 
In the third reading of the Covert Human Intelligence Sources (Criminal Conduct) Bill on 15 October 2020, the Labour Party stance was to abstain yet 34 Labour MPs rebelled, including shadow ministers Dan Carden and Margaret Greenwood, and five parliamentary private secretaries who all resigned from their frontbench roles. These 34 were penalised the next day by being put on probation for going against the one-line whip to abstain.

May 2021 Shadow Cabinet reshuffle 
In the aftermath of relatively poor results in the 2021 UK local elections, Starmer carried out a May 2021 British shadow cabinet reshuffle. Starmer dismissed Angela Rayner as Chair of the Labour Party and National Campaign Coordinator following the elections. The move was criticised by John McDonnell, former Shadow Chancellor of the Exchequer, and Andy Burnham, Mayor of Greater Manchester. The major outcome of the reshuffle was the demotion of the Shadow Chancellor, Anneliese Dodds. Rachel Reeves was appointed as the new Shadow Chancellor and Angela Rayner succeeded Reeves as Shadow Chancellor of the Duchy of Lancaster. Nick Brown was dismissed as Chief Whip and replaced by his deputy, Alan Campbell. Valerie Vaz departed as Shadow Leader of the House of Commons and was replaced by Thangam Debbonaire, who in turn was succeeded as Shadow Secretary of State for Housing by Lucy Powell. On 11 May 2021, Starmer's Parliamentary Private Secretary (PPS) Carolyn Harris resigned, which The Times reported was after allegedly spreading false rumours about the private life of Angela Rayner prior to her dismissal. Sharon Hodgson was appointed as Starmer's new PPS.

November 2021 Shadow Cabinet reshuffle 
The November 2021 British shadow cabinet reshuffle, which was considered a surprise, included the promotion of Yvette Cooper and David Lammy to Shadow Home Secretary and Shadow Secretary of State for Foreign, Commonwealth and Development Affairs, respectively, while Miliband was moved from Shadow Secretary of State for Business and Industrial Strategy to Shadow Secretary of State for Climate Change and Net Zero. The appointment of Cooper in particular was described by some commentators as a sign of Labour further splitting from the Corbyn leadership and moving to the right. The BBC's Laura Kuenssberg and Robert Peston of ITV News said that the reshuffle aimed to "combine experience and youth" and end "the fatuous project of trying to ... placate Labour's warring factions", and instead chose "shadow ministers for their perceived ability". In the New Statesman, journalist Stephen Bush suggested that Starmer had "removed underperforming shadow cabinet ministers and rewarded his biggest hitters – but the resulting shadow cabinet looks to be less than the sum of its parts."

2022 NATO and Ukraine policy dispute 
Shortly before the 2022 Russian invasion of Ukraine in February, 11 Labour backbench MPs signed a letter by the Stop the War Coalition that accused the UK government of "sabre-rattling" and said that NATO "should call a halt to its eastward expansion and commit to a new security deal for Europe which meets the needs of all states and peoples", whilst also arguing that NATO was an aggressive organisation due to military actions taken by its members outside its borders in the past. The MPs were asked by the party whips, representatives of the leadership tasked with maintaining discipline among Labour MPs, to remove their names from the statement under threat of being expelled from the party and all quickly agreed to do so. A spokesperson for the Labour Party said that this action ensured that every Labour MP understood that their party was on the side of "Britain, Nato, freedom and democracy". At around this time, Young Labour's Twitter account was suspended after it criticised the leadership policy towards NATO. In an interview with the BBC in March 2022, Starmer was asked whether he would be hoping that MPs who backed Stop the War "won't be standing at the next election or if they do whether [he would] be fully supporting them to do so". After repeatedly being accused of not answering the question, Starmer gave the answer of "well, they are Labour MPs and of course I support them, but all of our MPs will go through a process for selection into the next election".

Industrial action policy disputes 
The summer of 2022 saw significant amounts of industrial unrest. Starmer instructed members of his shadow cabinet to refrain from joining picketlines; some Labour MPs appeared on picket-lines including frontbenchers Kate Osborne, Paula Barker, Peter Kyle, and Navendu Mishra. The Labour Party's contingents in the Scottish and Welsh parliaments also took a different approach. Sam Tarry, Shadow Minister for Buses and Local Transport, was dismissed on 27 July after appearing on a rail strike picket. He said in a TV interview that workers should receive a pay rise in line with inflation though Labour policy was that pay increases should be based on negotiation. A spokesperson for the party said that "Sam Tarry was sacked because he booked himself onto media programmes without permission and then made up policy on the hoof." His dismissal was criticised by trade union leaders and Tarry wrote in an opinion piece for the I that "failing to join the striking rail workers on a picket line would have been an abject dereliction of duty for me as a Labour MP."

Public statements 
In an interview with the is Francis Elliott in December 2021, Starmer refused to characterise himself as a socialist, asking "What does that mean?" He added: "The Labour Party is a party that believes that we get the best from each other when we come together, collectively, and ensure that you know, we give people both opportunity and support as they needed."

Starmer has advocated for a government based on "security, prosperity and respect". He has said he wants crime reduced, maintaining that "too many people do not feel safe in their streets". He also wants to see "repairing after the pandemic". Starmer favours partnership between government and business, having said: "A political party without a clear plan for making sure businesses are successful and growing ... which doesn't want them to do well and make a profit ... has no hope of being a successful government."

In the 2020 Labour Party leadership election, Starmer ran on a pledge to renationalise rail, mail, water, and energy back into common ownership; he dropped this pledge in July 2022. In 2022 speeches, Starmer criticised the Conservative government and vowed to restore trust in government if he came to power. He described the Labour Party as "deeply patriotic" and cited its most successful leaders, Clement Attlee, Harold Wilson, and Tony Blair, for policies "rooted in the everyday concerns of working people".

COVID-19 
During the first COVID-19 pandemic lockdown, Starmer called for the government to publish an exit strategy outlining which parts of the economy and society would be prioritised once the government's tests for coming out of lockdown were met. He said that the government had been "too slow to enter the lockdown", and called for an exit plan in a "careful, considered way with public health, scientific evidence and the safety of workers and families". In June 2020, Starmer said he would support the government in "trying to do the right thing" when scrutinising the government's plans to ease lockdown restrictions. On 16 August, he called for the government to reopen schools in September 2020, saying there were "no ifs, no buts, no equivocation" regarding the decision.

Starmer made his first speech to the Labour Party Conference on 22 September 2020. He attacked the government's handling of the COVID-19 crisis, calling it "serial incompetence" and suggesting that Johnson was "just not up to the job". Labour unveiled "A New Leadership" as its slogan the day before the conference. In October 2020, Starmer called for the government to introduce a "circuit-breaker" stay-at-home order for at least two weeks to reduce the impact of COVID-19 over the winter, which had been revealed to have been recommended by the Scientific Advisory Group for Emergencies but not implemented by the government. In December 2020, Starmer was criticised for failing to challenge white nationalist, Great Replacement conspiracy theories made by a caller when he  was a guest on Nick Ferrari's programme on talk radio station LBC.

Foreign affairs 

Starmer was previously an advocate for a second Brexit referendum after the process of the UK withdrawal from the EU was completed; in 2021, he ruled out a return to free movement with the EU or substantial renegotiation of the EU–UK Trade and Cooperation Agreement if Labour won the next UK general election. Of the United States as it transitioned from the presidency of Donald Trump to that of Joe Biden, he said: "I'm anti-Trump but I'm pro-American. And I'm incredibly optimistic about the new relationship we can build with President Biden." He argued that "Britain is at its strongest" when it is "the bridge between the US and the rest of Europe."

During the prelude to the 2022 Russian invasion of Ukraine, Starmer held a meeting with NATO General Secretary Jens Stoltenberg and said in an interview with the BBC that Corbyn was "wrong" to be a critic of NATO and that the Labour Party's commitment to the alliance was "unshakeable". He elaborated on this point that he felt it was "important for me to make clear that we stand united in the UK ... Whatever challenges we have with the [Boris Johnson's] government, when it comes to Russian aggression we stand together." He said Russia should be hit with "widespread and hard-hitting" economic sanctions. He also criticised the Stop the War Coalition in an opinion piece for The Guardian arguing that they were "not benign voices for peace" but rather "[a]t best they are naive, at worst they actively give succour to authoritarian leaders" such as Vladimir Putin "who directly threaten democracies."

Education 
On education, Starmer, who benefited from a private school charity himself, vowed in 2021 to strip independent schools of their charitable status, a move that has been criticised by the Independent Schools Council, and he repeated the pledge in July 2022.

National Health Service 
On 15 January 2023, Starmer appeared on Sunday with Laura Kuenssberg, a BBC television programme. Despite having given a pledge to "end outsourcing in the NHS" during his campaign to become party leader, he told Kuenssberg that expanded use of the private sector would be considered as he would "look at all sorts of reform" for the public health service.  He maintained the public would not want a leader who “dogmatically insists that whatever was the position before can never change even when the circumstances have changed”.  Starmer maintained the private sector could help clear waiting lists.

Constitutional issues 

Opposing Scottish independence and a second referendum on the subject, the Labour Party under Starmer's leadership has set up a constitutional convention to address what he describes as a belief among people across the UK that "decisions about me should be taken closer to me." Starmer is against the reunification of Ireland, having stated that he would be "very much on the side of Unionists" if there were to be a border poll. Starmer wants to replace the House of Lords with an elected second chamber, Starmer maintains the Conservatives have too often given peerages to ‘lackeys and donors‘. A report published by the Labour Party in December 2022 recommended further devolution of powers both in England and too the smaller nations of the United Kingdom. The party has packaged some of these policies under the label "take back control", a slogan associated with the 2016 EU referendum.

Labour's five missions 
In a speech in Manchester on 23 February 2023, Starmer said he is already planning his second term as prime minister, and gave his list of five "national missions" as the basis for Labour's manifesto for the next election after which he expects to start his first term as prime minister. He would make the UK achieve fast, sustained economic growth.  Starmer would make the UK a "clean energy superpower", by 2030 all UK electricity would be generated without fossil fuel.  Starmer would improve the NHS and cut health inequalities.  He would reform the judicial system  and improve education standards.

Public opinion

Election results 

Starmer led the Labour Party into the 2021 local elections. On 11 March, Starmer launched Labour's local election campaign, with Angela Rayner (Deputy Leader), Sadiq Khan (Mayor of London), Mark Drakeford (First Minister of Wales), Anas Sarwar (Scottish Labour leader), and Tracy Brabin (Mayor of West Yorkshire candidate) as speakers. The party focused its election priorities on giving nurses a pay rise. This was during a period of popularity for the government in the wake of the COVID-19 vaccination programme; into the short campaign period, the Conservative Party started to develop a 6–7% poll lead on the Labour Party. Starmer was criticised for the Labour Party's failure to win the 2021 Hartlepool by-election. Hartlepool is part of the "red wall", a set of constituencies that historically supported the Labour Party but where the party is being challenged by increasing Conservative support. The Labour Party candidate Paul Williams was a vocal advocate of a second referendum on EU membership; 70% of voters in the constituency of Hartlepool had voted to leave the EU, leading to criticism that Starmer had made the wrong decision in advocating for Williams to be selected as the candidate. The Conservative candidate Jill Mortimer won the by-election with 51.9% of the vote and a swing from Labour of almost 16%. It became only the second time since 1982 that the governing party gained a seat in a by-election, and the first Conservative win in the constituency since its creation in 1974, with a majority of 6,940 votes.

At the local elections on 6 May 2021, the Labour Party lost 327 councillors and control of 8 councils. While it gained control of Mayor of the West of England and Cambridgeshire and Peterborough Combined Authority, the Labour Party failed to take the position of Mayor of the West Midlands. The party won a net equal number of police and crime commissioners. Elections also took place to the devolved Scottish Parliament and Senedd. In the 2021 Senedd election, Labour equalled its best ever result, falling one seat short of an overall majority, which has never been achieved in that institution, which the BBC reporter Adrian Browne credited to Mark Drakeford and approval of his handling of the COVID-19 pandemic in Wales. In the 2021 Scottish Parliament election, the party achieved its worst ever result at a Holyrood election, winning just 16 seats two less than in 2016. In July, Labour won the 2021 Batley and Spen by-election and held the seat, a result that was considered to have taken some pressure off Starmer's leadership.

The 2022 local elections on 5 May took place during a more difficult period for the government, which was facing problems such as Partygate and a cost of living crisis. The Labour Party made gains across Great Britain winning by far the largest number of seats overall. Starmer was criticised by many on the British Left, both in and outside of the Labour Party, as many felt that Starmer had underperformed in comparison with smaller parties, which made bigger net gains. In December 2022, Labour held both the City of Chester and Stretford and Urmston in by-elections with an increased margin for Labour.

Opinion polls 

Amid the reduced popularity of the Conservatives during 2022, Labour gained a lead in the opinion polling for the next general election. Since the end of 2021, Labour consistently polled ahead of the Conservatives as the governments under prime ministers Boris Johnson, Liz Truss, and Rishi Sunak were affected by issues such as the cost of living crisis, the July 2022 government crisis, the September 2022 mini-budget, the October 2022 government crisis, and the industrial disputes. By mid-October 2022, Labour were recording polling leads such as 36% against the Conservatives according to Redfield & Wilton. Labour won the December 2022 City of Chester by-election, the party's best-ever result in the seat.

Party management

2020 antisemitism report and exclusion of Corbyn 
In October 2020, following the release of the Equality and Human Rights Commission's report into antisemitism in the party, Starmer accepted its findings in full and apologised to Jews on behalf of the party. Later that day, Labour suspended former leader Corbyn over his response to the report. Some saw Starmer's actions as "civil war" against the left wing of the party, and many on the left called for Corbyn's suspension to be lifted. Starmer's refusal to reverse the decision regarding Corbyn's suspension, and later the whip, resulted in sections of the left feeling alienated.

On 14 November 2022, it was reported that the leadership of the Labour Party would not restore the whip to Corbyn, preventing him from ever again standing for election on behalf of the Labour Party. This led to criticism and speculation Corbyn could stand for election as the Mayor of London or in his current Parlimentary constituency as an independent candidate, in opposition to Labour.

2021 party governance changes 
In the run up to Labour's conference in September 2021, the party announced plans to reform its governance structure with changes including the return of its older electoral college which would give MPs, members and trade unions a third of the vote each in future leadership elections. Starmer's spokespeople said that this was a way to strengthen the party's link with the trade union movement but commentators described the changes as an attempt to increase the power of MPs and trade unions at the expense of the general membership, along with being a symbolic act to draw a distinction between Starmer and Corbyn.

Starmer gave up on the electoral college after it failed to gain the support of trade unions; the party's executive committee agreed to send a series of more modest reforms to conference, including increasing the percentage of Labour MPs a candidate would need the support of to get on the leadership election ballot, banning the party's newest members from voting, and making it harder for members to deselect MPs. These changes were later passed by a small margin. The Bakers, Food and Allied Workers' Union voted to end its affiliation to Labour dating back to early in the party's history, commenting that it had "travelled away from the aims and hopes of working-class organisations like ours" under Starmer's leadership.

Forde Report and factionalism 

In April 2020, an internal party report on antisemitism (The Work of the Labour Party’s Governance and Legal Unit in Relation to Anti-semitism, 2014-2019) was leaked. It was made during the end of Corbyn's leadership, intended for submission to the EHRC, and dated March 2020. It detailed that there was a tangible issue with antisemitism in the party, but factional hostility to Corbyn hampered efforts to tackle it. In January 2023, it was reported that the Information Commissioner's Office (ICO) were not going to take action against the Corbyn-supporting authors of the report, which leaked with unredacted confidential information, and that the Labour Party would pursue a civil case against them. This internal report led to the Forde Report.

On 17 July 2022, the Forde Report was published, having been commissioned by Starmer at the beginning of his leadership. It described how groups within Labour had sought to hinder Corbyn while leader of the Labour Party and said that during his leadership it broke into factions which supported or opposed him, though this factionalism had decreased since Starmer took leadership. The report said that groups within the party who were in support and opposition to Corbyn both sought to use allegations of antisemitism in the party during his leadership to further their political interests. The report detailed bullying, racism, and sexism within the party.

The report also said many of those within the party it gathered evidence from were concerned the party operated a "hierarchy of racism or of discrimination", with more resources being allocated to investigate claims of antisemitism, amid their surge and political importance, compared to other forms of discrimination. Starmer was criticised for his lack of response to the report and the problems within the party that it highlighted, in particular anti-black racism.

In September 2022, Al Jazeera began publishing The Labour Files, a series of internal Labour Party documents and associated reports on anti-Corbyn corruption during his leadership as well as current anti-black racism and Islamophobia in the Labour Party. Starmer was criticised for failing to acknowledge or address the findings of The Labour Files.

In February 2023, Starmer's antisemitism reforms resulted in the party no longer being monitored by the Equality and Human Rights Commission (EHRC).

Election candidate selection process controversy 
With the Labour Party needing to gain many new seats if they are to win the next election, and with at least a dozen of their standing MPs planning to stand down before the next election, by early November 2022, the party had started the selection process for the new candidates they will need.

In October and November 2022, Starmer was accused of designing and using Labour's new selection process for parliamentary candidates to prevent Corbyn-supporting, left-wing, or disloyal prospective MPs from being able to stand at the next general election.

Party members who supported Jeremy Corbyn, the party's previous leader, are saying that under Starmer's leadership, they are being targeted for exclusion by the selection process. Under the selection system, step one is to get onto a 'longlist', which will then be refined down to a 'shortlist'. BBC News says that unnamed potential candidates have said that party employees are being "tasked" to search their online activities for reasons to keep them off the 'longlist'. One unnamed Labour MP from the left of the party said of the party leadership that they were "drunk on power" and that they went "beyond anything from the Blair years". The party defended this activity saying it was for quality control purposes.  John McTernan, a former advisor for Tony Blair, supported the activity, saying Labour needs to return "good MPs" with "mainstream Labour values" for the coming election adding that under Corbyn, too much "flotsam and jetsam" became Labour MPs.  A Labour representative said "Due diligence is about weeding out candidates who could cause electoral damage".

On 13 November 2022, The Guardian said that under Starmer, the way the selection panel has "exerted tight control" over how candidates are selected for shortlisting had become "extraordinary". Starmer "allies" say that selection vetting needs to be tougher as there has recently been a lot of MPs "suspended, arrested or [...] embarrassed for ill-advised tweets". The Guardian added that the measures often appear to be factional even though previous scandals have not solely involved candidates from the party's left. The co-chair of Momentum, Hilary Schan, said how times were hard for the left in the Labour party, amid the "controversy over party selections" in which candidates from the left-wing of the party were "excluded from shortlists". New Statesman credits Starmer's campaign director, Morgan McSweeney, with the idea of "marginalising left-wingers" using a more stringent selection process.

On 27 January 2023, HuffPost reported that after an encounter with the leaders of Scottish Labour and Welsh Labour, Starmer had "been forced into a U-turn" over the candidate selection process. Scotland's Anas Sarwar and Wales's Mark Drakeford were said to be "frustrated" for not being consulted over the idea of imposing the process used in England on the Scottish and Welsh branches of the party. Following the exchange, it is reported that it was agreed that any new process would have to be agreed jointly. The fear of the proposed English system was that it was designed to prioritise candidates close to the leadership, and to block candidates on the left of the party, thus be used to “stitch up” the candidate shortlists. Starmer's aides characterised the English checks as being used to weed out candidates who may be unsuitable to stand for parliament or who may risk damaging the party’s reputation.

Drop in party membership numbers 
Starmer inherited a party membership of 552,835 when he replaced Jeremy Corbyn as leader in April 2020. By the time of the NEC vote seven months later, that had dropped by 56,874, more than 10%, to 495,961, but still the largest of any UK party. The drop coincided with a number of challenges Starmer faced due to his relationship with the left of the party, including in response to his suspension of Corbyn from the party, and his removal of Rebecca Long-Bailey from his shadow cabinet.

By the end of 2021, membership had fallen to 432,213, a drop of more than 21% since Starmer became leader, but still more than double the membership of the Conservative Party. Momentum, a left-wing campaign group, said Starmer's "factional" leadership was to blame as it alienated trade unions. Starmer dismissed this, saying it followed the pattern of membership going up before an election and flattening off again after. According to The Guardian, the future of Momentum, a grassroots group of left-wing Labour Party members, is in jeopardy due to financial difficulties as "thousands of leftwingers have deserted the Labour party under Keir Starmer’s leadership".

See also 

 Labour Party leadership of Jeremy Corbyn – Starmer's predecessor in the role

References

Keir Starmer
Starmer
2020s in British politics